Ludwig Stössel (12 February 1883 – 29 January 1973) was an actor born in Lockenhaus, now Austria, then Hungary. He was one of many Jewish actors and actresses who were forced to flee Germany when the Nazis came to power in 1933.

Biography
Stössel began performing on the stage in Austria and Germany when he was only 17. Stössel later became a movie actor. His first motion picture was a small role in the silent movie In der Heimat, da gibt's ein Wiedersehn! (We'll Meet Again in the Homeland) in 1926 at the age of 43. He appeared in about a half dozen silent movies in Germany and landed more roles with the arrival of sound.

Stössel's first sound movie was Georg Wilhelm Pabst's Skandal um Eva ((Scandalous Eva)) in 1930. The following year, he appeared in Max Neufeld's Opernredoute (The Opera Ball). Later that year, he appeared as a hotel owner in the German comedy Die Koffer des Herrn O.F. (The Suitcases of Mr. O.F.), starring Peter Lorre and Hedy Lamarr. In 1932, he appeared as Riederer in Der Rebell (The Rebel). In 1933, Stössel had a small part in Fritz Lang's famous mystery thriller Das Testament des Dr. Mabuse (The Testament of Dr. Mabuse), a film that was later banned by the Nazi government. His appearance in Carl Boese's 1933 comedy Heimkehr ins Glück (Homecoming to Happiness) would be his last movie in Germany.

When Adolf Hitler came to power in 1933, Stössel was forced to leave Germany because of his Jewish background. He returned to Austria and appeared in a few movies, but he concentrated on the theater. In 1934, he appeared in the comedy Eine Nacht in Venedig (A Night in Venice). His last movie in Austria was in 1937 with Pfarrer von Kirchfeld (The Priest from Kirchfeld). After Hitler's forces took over Austria in the Anschluß of 1938, Stössel was imprisoned several times before he was able to escape Vienna and get to Paris. He and his wife, Lore Birn, eventually reached London. He appeared in Dead Man's Shoes and another British film production before heading to Hollywood in 1939.

Stössel made his American movie debut in 1940, playing a pastor in Czechoslovakia during the Nazi takeover in the wartime drama Four Sons, starring Don Ameche. In 1942, he appeared with Ilka Grüning in Underground. Stössel and Grünig were reunited in the Oscar-nominated Kings Row, starring Ronald Reagan, Ann Sheridan and Claude Rains. Stössel and Grünig also appeared together in the Sonja Henie film Iceland. Later that year, Stössel was cast to play Lou Gehrig's father in Pride of the Yankees starring Gary Cooper in the title role. A few months later, at the age of 59, he played Mr. Leuchtag, who is leaving Europe for America with his wife in Casablanca.

Stössel appeared in supporting roles in over 40 movies after Casablanca, most in the following ten years. The next year, he had a small role in another Humphrey Bogart movie, Action in the North Atlantic. He did a couple of anti-Nazi movies, such as Hitler's Madman (1943), in which he portrayed the mayor of a small town that is wiped out by a Nazi mass execution in reprisal for the assassination of SS Commander Reinhard Heydrich. Later that year, he appeared in The Strange Death of Adolf Hitler.

In 1944, he appeared in the Boris Karloff horror movie The Climax. Later in 1944, Stössel teamed up with his movie wife from Pride of the Yankees, Elsa Janssen, to play Mr. and Mrs. Steelman, a German couple loyal to America who drive their traitorous pro-Nazi son, played by George Sanders (who is actually working undercover for the U.S. government), out of their house in the spy drama They Came to Blow Up America. In 1945, they teamed up again to play Mr. and Mrs. Otto in the "B" crime drama Dillinger. Next, he was bitten in the throat by Count Dracula, played by John Carradine, in House of Dracula. Later in 1945, Stössel played a teacher, who along with a llama, is in the opening scene of the Fred Astaire musical Yolanda and the Thief.

When the Second World War ended in 1945, Stössel decided not to return to Germany like many other German actors and actresses, but remained in his adopted country making movies. In 1946, Grünig and Stössel got to play husband and wife again in Temptation starring Merle Oberon, George Brent and Paul Lukas.

In 1947, he had a small role portraying Albert Einstein in The Beginning or the End. In 1948, he portrayed one of the lonely bachelor professors at a musical research institute in the Danny Kaye musical A Song is Born. In 1949, Grünig and Stössel appeared in their last film together when they received roles in the drama The Great Sinner, starring Gregory Peck and Ava Gardner. In 1953, Stössel played a grand duke in the musical Call Me Madam, starring Ethel Merman and Donald O'Connor. His last film was in 1960, where he had a small role in the Elvis Presley movie G.I. Blues.

Stössel also performed on television. In 1955, he played Ludwig, a Carl the waiter clone, in the television version of Casablanca. He made two guest appearances on Perry Mason during the series' second season, including the role of Adolph Van Beers in "The Case of the Shattered Dream." From 1958 to 1960, Stössel played Charles Bronson's father in ABC's television series Man with a Camera. From 1953 to 1963, Stössel appeared as a guest in a number of television shows, including Cavalcade of America, My Three Sons, The Donna Reed Show, and The New Phil Silvers Show (where he parodied his Gallo wine television commercials). He guest-starred in two Robert Young series, the situation comedy Father Knows Best and the comedy-drama series Window on Main Street.

Stössel became famous for a long series of commercials for Italian Swiss Colony wine producers. Dressed in an Alpine hat and lederhosen, he was their spokesman. His motto was "That Little Old Winemaker, Me!" (they did not use his voice, but had Jim Backus dub the line).

Stössel died on January 29, 1973, in Beverly Hills after a fall just 14 days short of his 90th birthday. He was cremated at Hollywood Forever Cemetery, with the ashes sent to Vienna, Austria.

Complete filmography

 We'll Meet Again in the Heimat (1926) - Freund
 Herkules Maier (1928) 
 Serenissimus und die letzte Jungfrau (1928) - Direktor der Florida-Bar
 Aus dem Tagebuch eines Junggesellen (1929) - Herr von Pollak
 Möblierte Zimmer (1929)
 Favorite of Schonbrunn (1929)
 Katharina Knie (1929)
 Heute nacht - eventuell (1930)
 Scandalous Eva (1930) - Dir.Rohrbach
 Ein Burschenlied aus Heidelberg (1930)
 Bockbierfest (1930) - Livius Heintze - Fabrikant
 Die Privatsekretärin (1931) - Personalchef Klapper
 Königin einer Nacht (1931)
 In Wien hab' ich einmal ein Mädel geliebt (1931) - Valentin Rainer - Souffleur
 Elisabeth von Österreich (1931) - Bratfisch
 Opernredoute (1931)
 Alarm at Midnight (1931) - Der Varieté-Agent
 Die Koffer des Herrn O.F. (1931) - Hotelier Brunn
 Man braucht kein Geld (1931)
 Chauffeur Antoinette (1932) - Baron Kiesel
 Nachtkolonne (1932)
 Zum goldenen Anker (1932) - Escartefigue
 Die Gräfin von Monte-Christo (1932)
 Strich durch die Rechnung (1932)
 Der Rebell (1932) - Riederer, Amtshauptmann von St. Vigil
 Das Testament des Dr. Mabuse (1933) - Arbeiter / Worker
 Morgenrot (1933)
 Der Läufer von Marathon (1933)
 Hände aus dem Dunkel (1933) - Generaldirektor Leon
 Johannisnacht (1933) - Theaterdirektor
 Heimkehr ins Glück (1933) - Pichler
 Rund um eine Million (1933) - Der Hoteldirektor
 Nordpol - Ahoi! (1934) - Director
 Eine Nacht in Venedig (1934)
 Der Pfarrer von Kirchfeld (1937) - Vetter, der Pfarrer von Skt. Jakob
 Return to Yesterday (1940) - Capt. Angst
 Dead Man's Shoes (1940) - Dr. Breithaut
 Four Sons (1940) - Pastor
 The Man I Married (1940) - Dr. Gerhardt
 Dance, Girl, Dance (1940) - Caesar
 The Flying Squad (1940) - Li Yoseph
 Jenny (1940) - Fritz Schermer
 Back Street (1941) - Louis (uncredited)
 Man Hunt (1941) - Doctor
 Underground (1941) - Herr Müller
 Down in San Diego (1941) - Brock (uncredited)
 Great Guns (1941) - Dr. Schickel
 Marry the Boss's Daughter (1941) - Franz Polgar
 All Through the Night (1942) - Mr. Herman Miller
 Kings Row (1942) - Professor Berdorff
 Woman of the Year (1942) - Dr. Lubbeck
 I Married an Angel (1942) - Bela (uncredited)
 The Pride of the Yankees (1942) - Pop Gehrig
 Iceland (1942) - Valtyr's Father (uncredited)
 Who Done It? (1942) - Dr. Anton Marek
 Casablanca (1942) - Mr. Leuchtag (uncredited)
 Tennessee Johnson (1942) - Austrian Ambassador (uncredited)
 Pittsburgh (1942) - Dr. Grazlich
 The Great Impersonation (1942) - Dr. Schmidt
 Above Suspicion (1943) - Herr Schultz (uncredited)
 They Came to Blow Up America (1943) - Papa Julius Steelman
 Action in the North Atlantic (1943) - Captain Ziemer (uncredited)
 What We Are Fighting For (1943, Short) - Underground Leader
 Hitler's Madman (1943) - Herman Bauer
 Hers to Hold (1943) - Binns
 The Strange Death of Adolf Hitler (1943) - Graub
 The Climax (1944) - Carl Baumann
 Bluebeard (1944) - Jean Lamarte
 Lake Placid Serenade (1944) - Mayor of Lany
 Dillinger (1945) - Mr. Otto
 Her Highness and the Bellboy (1945) - Mr. Puft
 Yolanda and the Thief (1945) - School Teacher
 House of Dracula (1945) - Siegfried
 Girl on the Spot (1946) - "Popsy" Lorenz
 Miss Susie Slagle's (1946) - Otto
 Cloak and Dagger (1946) - The German
 Temptation (1946) - Dr. Mueller
 The Beginning or the End (1947) - Dr. Albert Einstein
 Song of Love (1947) - Haslinger
 This Time for Keeps (1947) - Peter
 Escape Me Never (1947) - Mr. Steinach
 A Song is Born (1948) - Professor Traumer
 The Great Sinner (1949) - Hotel Manager
 As Young as You Feel (1951) - Serge Toulevitsky (uncredited)
 Corky of Gasoline Alley (1951) - Dr. Hammerschlag (uncredited)
 Too Young to Kiss (1951) - German Piano Accompanist (uncredited)
 The Last Half Hour: The Mayerling Story (1951, TV Movie) - Bratfisch, Coachman
 Diplomatic Courier (1952) - Watchmaker (uncredited)
 The Merry Widow (1952) - Major Domo
 Somebody Loves Me (1952) - Mr. D.J. Grauman (uncredited)
 No Time for Flowers (1952) - Papa Svoboda
 The Sun Shines Bright (1953) - Herman Felsburg
 Call Me Madam (1953) - Grand Duke Otto
 Geraldine (1953) - Professor Berger
 With This Ring (1954, Short)
 Lady in the Wings (1954, TV Movie)
 Deep in My Heart (1954) - Mr. Novak (uncredited)
 Me and the Colonel (1958) - Dr. Szicki
 From the Earth to the Moon (1958) - Aldo Von Metz
 The Blue Angel (1959) - Dr. Fritz Heine
 G.I. Blues (1960) - Owner of Puppet Show

References

External links

 
 
 
 
 Italian Swiss Colony Wine commercial featuring Stössel on YouTube

1883 births
1973 deaths
Austrian male film actors
Austrian male silent film actors
20th-century Austrian male actors
Austrian Jews
Jewish Austrian male actors
People from Oberpullendorf District
Austrian emigrants to Germany
German emigrants to the United States